Totoró is a town and municipality in the Cauca Department, Colombia.

Climate
Totoró has a comfortable subtropical highland climate (Köppen Cfb) due to its location at approximately  altitude. It has moderate rainfall year-round. It is the cloudiest and least sunny town in the world.

References

External links

Municipalities of Cauca Department